Shawn Evans (born September 7, 1965) is a Canadian former ice hockey player.

Early life 
Evans was born in Kingston, Ontario. As a youth, he played in the 1978 Quebec International Pee-Wee Hockey Tournament with a minor ice hockey team from Kingston Township.

Career 
Evans played nine games in the National Hockey League between 1986 and 1989 with the St. Louis Blues and New York Islanders. The rest of his career, which lasted from 1985 to 1999, was spent in various minor leagues. At one time, he held the single season American Hockey League record for assists by a defenseman, a mark he set with the Nova Scotia Oilers in 1987 and surpassed in 1992 with the Springfield Indians.

After retiring as a player, he became the head coach and general manager of the Truro Bearcats.

Career statistics

Regular season and playoffs

References

External links
 

1965 births
Living people
Baton Rouge Kingfish players
Canadian ice hockey defencemen
Cincinnati Cyclones (IHL) players
EHC Olten players
Fort Wayne Komets players
HC Milano players
Ice hockey people from Ontario
Maine Mariners players
Manitoba Moose (IHL) players
Milwaukee Admirals (IHL) players
Mohawk Valley Prowlers players
New Jersey Devils draft picks
New York Islanders players
Nova Scotia Oilers players
Peoria Rivermen (IHL) players
Peterborough Petes (ice hockey) players
Springfield Indians players
St. Louis Blues players
Sportspeople from Kingston, Ontario